The University of Ballarat, Australia was a dual-sector university with multiple campuses in Victoria, Australia, including its main Ballarat campus, Melbourne,  Sydney, and Adelaide that were authorized by the university to provide diploma, undergraduate and postgraduate programs. The university offered traditional programs, including business, information technology, building and construction, engineering, mining, education, social sciences, nursing, hospitality, and art.

The University of Ballarat's history goes back to the gold rush era of the 1850s. It began as a tertiary school in 1870. In 1970, Founders Theatre was built at the Mt Helen campus after an appeal was made to commemorate the opening of the school 100 years earlier. The theatre opened in 1981.

The University of Ballarat was formed from a number of varying types of schools. The earliest was the School of Mines in 1870, which subsequently merged with other related organizations. Another was through Ballarat Base Hospital School of Nursing (1888). Ballarat College of Advanced Education was formed in 1976 with what began as a teacher's college in 1926, and Ballarat Institute of Advanced Education, which began in 1967 when it split from the School of Mines.

The university merged with Monash University's Gippsland (Churchill) campus in 2013, under the new name Federation University Australia.

History

School of Mines 
Tertiary education at Ballarat began with the establishment of the Ballarat School of Mines in 1870, making it Australia's third oldest tertiary institution. Redmond Barry was its first president, and he was involved in the creation of university degree level courses for the school. The School of Mines had two divisions - a tertiary division and a technical division. The tertiary division provided higher education courses such as mining engineering, geology, education and business studies, while the technical division provided such programs as wool classing, plumbing and bricklaying.

The organisation remained in that form until 1967 when it was split into three institutions, Ballarat School of Industries, Ballarat Technical School, and Ballarat Institute of Advanced Education. They remained three entities until 1976. Ballarat Institute of Advanced Education merged into Ballarat College of Advanced Education. The Ballarat School of Industries and Ballarat Technical School merged into the School of Mines and Industries, Ballarat (SMB) in 1976.

Several entities merged or had arrangements with SMB. In 1994, a memo of understanding (MOU) was signed between SMB and the Ararat Technical School, which was founded in 1969. Then, in 1998, SMB and the Horsham-based Wimmera Institute of TAFE (1984), dating back to 1882, merged into the University of Ballarat to create a larger University.

Ballarat College of Advanced Education
In 1976, the Ballarat College of Advanced Education (Ballarat CAE) was formed with the merger of the Ballarat Institute of Advanced Education (1967) with the State College of Victoria, Ballarat—that began as Ballarat Teachers' College in 1926.

The Dawkins Revolution of the late 1980s saw a merger of large metropolitan colleges of advanced education with universities, and although the college struggled with the options, it chose to remain as a CAE.

Ballarat University College
Ballarat University College was formed in 1990, and became an affiliated college of the University of Melbourne. Its name was changed to "Ballarat University College, an affiliated College of the University of Melbourne", the actual name used on graduates' testamurs.

Ballarat University College then sought to become a fully-fledged university in its own right when Professor John Sharpham asked the board of BUC why, if Southern Cross University was allowed to separate from the University of New England by becoming a university in its own right, Ballarat should not be allowed to do the same. The Federal Government was lobbied and responded by sending three Vice-Chancellors (one of them, incidentally, being from the University of New England) to Ballarat to consider the matter. The result was favorable and the university college became a university in 1994. Its sole link to the University of Melbourne was that Melbourne would observe the academic standards at the new university for a five-year period.

University of Ballarat

The University of Ballarat was organised in 1994, after being sponsored by the University of Melbourne for five years, and due to the passage of an Act of the Victorian Parliament.

In 1998, the Ballarat School of Mines and Industries (1870) and the Horsham-based Wimmera Institute of TAFE merged into the university, expanding its curriculum.

The university's English and Academic Preparation (EAP) prepared international students for a university education in Australia and  improved student's ability to read, write, speak, and listen to the English language.  The Ballarat had five campuses, and it offered traditional university programs, including business, information technology, building and construction, engineering, mining, education, social sciences, nursing, hospitality, and art. In addition  to traditional classroom learning, the school offered online learning courses.

According to the university's records, there were 25,810 students consisting of 13,820 higher education students and 11,990 technical and further education students in 2008. Of the total student population, 11,460 students were at the Ballarat campus. There were 6,145 master's students, as compared to the 6,048 bachelor students. There were 12,481 students located off-campus, based on partnerships with partnership institutions.

The university was a member of the Association of Commonwealth Universities. All transcripts issued by the university are accredited by Australian Core Skills Framework and Australian Qualifications Framework.

The school achieved a 5-star rating for teaching quality in the 2013 and 2014 edition of The Good Universities Guide. The same survey showed that graduates gave the school a 4-star rating for its ability to teach general skills, cultural diversity, graduation success, and the aided in their ability to get a job.

Merger to Federation University Australia 

The university merged with Monash University's Gippsland (Churchill) campus in 2013, and the merged schools are now the Federation University Australia. The name change was made as the result of the passage of the amended University of Ballarat Act 2010 bill through the state's parliament. Its name no longer carries the name of Ballarat because the intention is not to be limiting geographically. It also wanted to reflect its intention to continue offering education to domestic and international students. Students who were enrolled at the time of the merger and name change were allowed to choose the name of the institution shown on their graduation documents. The name change went into effect on 1 January 2014.

Notable alumni 

 David Noonan, Australian artist who lives and works in London
 Aunty Donna, absurdist sketch comedy troupe
 Kate Suratin
 Steve Bracks, former Premier of Victoria
 Sandy Blythe, wheelchair basketball player
 Dr. Cyril P. Callister, an Australian chemist and food technologist
 Jacqueline Dark, opera singer
 Keith Hamilton, former Minister for Agriculture and former Minister for Aboriginal Affairs
 William Roy Hodgson, Human Rights Diplomat
 Will Longstaff
Isolde Standish is an Australian and British Humanities Scholar and Film theorist specialised in East Asia.

See also 

List of universities in Australia
 Federation University Australia

Notes

References

External links 
 Federation University Australia, formerly University of Ballarat

Defunct universities and colleges in Australia
1850s establishments in Australia
Education in Ballarat